Patrick Tam may refer to:

Patrick Tam (film director) (born 1948), Hong Kong film director
Patrick Tam (actor) (born 1969), Hong Kong actor and singer
Patrick Tam (biologist), Australian microbiologist